Perkins House may refer to:

 William Perkins House, Eutaw, Alabama, listed on the NRHP in Alabama
 Maxwell E. Perkins House, New Canaan, Connecticut, listed on the NRHP
 Perkins-Bill House, Gales Ferry, Connecticut, listed on the NRHP
 Perkins-Rockwell House, Norwich, Connecticut, listed on the NRHP
 Perkins-Clark House, Hartford, Connecticut, listed on the NRHP
Palmer-Perkins House, Monticello, Florida, listed on the NRHP
 Perkins Opera House, Monticello, Florida, listed on the NRHP
 Dwight Perkins House, Evanston, Illinois, listed on the NRHP in Illinois
 Charles W. and Nellie Perkins House, Cedar Rapids, Iowa, listed on the NRHP in Iowa
 Perkins–Daniel House, Lancaster, Kentucky, listed on the NRHP in Kentucky
 Lucien Perkins Farm, Lancaster, Kentucky, listed on the NRHP in Kentucky
 Dr. John Milton Perkins House, Somerset, Kentucky, listed on the NRHP in Kentucky
 John Perkins House (Castine, Maine), listed on the NRHP in Maine
 Charles Perkins House, Ogunquit, Maine, listed on the NRHP in Maine
 Perkins Estate, Brookline, Massachusetts, listed on the NRHP
 Joseph Perkins House, Methuen, Massachusetts, listed on the NRHP
 John Perkins House (Wenham, Massachusetts), listed on the NRHP in Essex County
 Perkins House (DeKalb, Mississippi), listed on the NRHP in Mississippi
 Perkins–Wiener House, Red Cloud, Nebraska, listed on the NRHP in Nebraska
 Perkins House (Moorestown, New Jersey), listed on the NRHP in New Jersey
 Jackson–Perkins House, Newark, New York, listed on the NRHP
 Perkins House (Newton, North Carolina), listed on the NRHP in North Carolina
 Perkins Stone Mansion, Akron, Ohio, listed on the NRHP in Ohio
 Still–Perkins House, Milton-Freewater, Oregon, listed on the NRHP in Oregon
 Nicholas Tate Perkins House, Franklin, Tennessee, listed on the NRHP
 A. E. Perkins House, Jacksboro, Tennessee, listed on the NRHP in Tennessee
 Hall–Sayers–Perkins House, Bastrop, Texas, listed on the NRHP in Texas
 Crouch–Perkins House, McKinney, Texas, listed on the NRHP in Texas
 Perkins, James I. and Myrta Blake, House, Rusk, Texas, listed on the NRHP in Texas
 Arthur Perkins House, Rutland, Vermont, listed on the NRHP in Vermont
 Frances Perkins House, Washington, D.C., listed on the NRHP in Washington, D.C.
 James A. Perkins House, Colfax, Washington, listed on the NRHP in Washington

See also
John Perkins House (disambiguation)